Zareba may refer to

 Zaręba, a Polish village 
 Zareba (ship structure), a breakwater-like structure on ships, intended to deflect sea-water off the deck
 Zareba, an enclosure of bushes or stakes protecting a campsite or village in northeast Africa